The 2022 season was Selangor's 17th season in the Super League  and their 37th consecutive season in the top flight of Malaysia football. The club also participates in the Malaysia Cup and will also participate in the FA Cup.

Review

For 2022 season, Selangor make a change management with recruit Michael Feichtenbeiner as a new coach for the club, with Karsten Neitzel will remain at the club and continue to be an important part of the coaching team for 2022 season as the First Team Assistant Head Coach. Former Selangor player, Nidzam Jamil return to the club and also will become First Team Assistant Head Coach alongside Neitzel. 

On 9 August 2022, it was announced that coach Feichtenbeiner had left his role by mutual consent and that Nidzam Jamil had replaced him as caretaker coach, after starting the 2022 season he left the worst record season with just collect four wins in the first 13 Super League games, leaving Selangor 19 points behind the league leaders.  

On 24 September 2022, Selangor appointed the former Malaysia national football team coach, Tan Cheng Hoe as the new Head Coach of the Red Giants first team to allow him to start preparing early and plan for next season.

After finish 5th in the league, Selangor qualified to enter the 2022 Malaysia Cup in the knockout stage, after The Malaysian Football League (MFL) announced that there will be no group stage action for the tournament where all teams will be drawn to start the challenge in the round of 16.

At the end of the season, Selangor with achievement finished their league campaign in the fifth (5th) position, reach the semi-final FA Cup and become runner-up in Malaysia Cup.

Pre-season and friendlies

Squad information

First-team squad

Reserve Team Squad (call-up)

Transfers

First Transfers

Transfers in

Loan in

Transfer out 
 

Loan out

Competitions

Overall

Overview

Super League

Table

Results summary

Results by round

Fixtures and Results

Super League

Results overview

FA Cup

Malaysia Cup

Knockout stage

Round of 16

Quarter-finals

Semi-finals

Final

Statistics

Squad statistics
 

Appearances (Apps.) numbers are for appearances in competitive games only including sub appearances.
Red card numbers denote: Numbers in parentheses represent red cards overturned for wrongful dismissal.

† Player left the club during the season.

Goalscorers
Includes all competitive matches.

Top assists

Clean sheets

Disciplinary record

 

† Player left the club during the season.

Notes

References

Selangor
Selangor FA